Glading is a surname. Notable people with the surname include:

Billy Glading, American lacrosse player
Bob Glading (1920–2014), New Zealand golfer
Dan Glading (born 1986), American lacrosse player
Laura Glading, American labor leader
Percy Glading, English communist
Gregory Glading, American author
Pierce Glading, American baseball player